InciWeb is an interagency all-risk incident web information management system provided by the United States Forest Service released in 2004.  It was originally developed for wildland fire emergencies, but can be also used for other emergency incidents (natural disasters, such as earthquakes, floods, hurricanes, and tornadoes).

Introduction

It was developed with two primary missions:

 1. Provide the public a single source of incident related information 
 2. Provide a standardized reporting tool for the Public Affairs community

Official announcements include evacuations, road closures, news releases, maps, photographs, and basic info and current situation about the incident.

Incident information can be accessed by:
 web browser at http://inciweb.nwcg.gov
 Twitter
 RSS web feed

Technical 
The original application was hosted at the United States Forest Service - Wildland Fire Training and Conference Center, at McClellan Airfield, California, comprising three servers:
Database server
Administrative server
Load balancer for the public content which routes traffic to a pool of eight servers.

Web traffic averages 2 million plus hits daily during the fire season with the ability to handle 3.5 million hits.

The servers were moved to the National information Technology Center (NITC), Kansas City, Missouri on July 16, 2008, along with the release of version 2.0; the current version is 2.2.

Availability issues
InciWeb was having technical difficulties due to the high volume of Internet users trying to access the site during the September–October 2006 Day Fire and the Summer 2008 California wildfires.

Participating agencies
United States Forest Service
Bureau of Land Management
Bureau of Indian Affairs
Fish and Wildlife Service
National Park Service
National Oceanic & Atmospheric Administration
Department of the Interior Office of Aircraft Services
National Association of State Foresters
United States Fire Administration

These same agencies are also in the National Interagency Fire Center.

See also
Incident Command System
Incident management

References

External links
 Inciweb official website
 Judith L. Downing, Ronald W. Hodgson, Jonathan G. Taylor, and Shana C. Gillette. Fire Information for Communities at Risk in Interface Wildfires: Lessons Learned From the 2003 Southern California Megafires. pages 135-152 in Fire Social Science Research From the Pacific Southwest Research Station: Studies Supported by National Fire Plan Funds. August 2008. United States Forest Service.  InciWeb is mentioned on page 139, footnote 11.

2004 establishments in the United States
Wildfires
Web applications
Incident management
Disaster preparedness in the United States
Firefighting in the United States
Management systems
Emergency management software